The Landesliga West is, together with the Landesliga Ost, the second-highest division of Tyrol and the fifth-highest division in Austrian football. The champions advance into the Tiroler Liga. In the 2015/16 season, FC Zirl was able to secure the championship.

External links
 Landeliga West

References

Football competitions in Austria
Sport in Tyrol (state)